Moonfire may refer to:
 Moonfire (album), a 2011 album by Boy & Bear
 Moonfire (film), a 1970 action adventure film
 Of a Fire on the Moon, a 1970 book by Norman Mailer, later republished as Moonfire